The 1968 Preakness Stakes was the 93rd running of the $200,000 Preakness Stakes thoroughbred horse race. The race took place on May 18, 1968, and was televised in the United States on the CBS television network. Forward Pass, who was jockeyed by Ismael Valenzuela, won the race by six lengths over runner-up Out Of The Way. Approximate post time was 5:31 p.m. Eastern Time. The race was run on a fast track in a final time of 1:56-4/5.  The Maryland Jockey Club reported total attendance of 40,247, this is recorded as second highest on the list of American thoroughbred racing top attended events for North America in 1968.

Payout 

The 93rd Preakness Stakes Payout Schedule

The full chart 

 A *D signifies that Dancer's Image ran third but was Disqualified and placed eighth.
 Winning Breeder: Calumet Farm; (KY)
 Winning Time: 1:56 4/5
 Track Condition: Fast
 Total Attendance: 40,247

References

External links 
 

1968
1968 in horse racing
1968 in American sports
1968 in sports in Maryland
May 1968 sports events in the United States
Horse races in Maryland